Isotoma pusilla,  commonly known as small isotome, is a small herbaceous perennial in the family Campanulaceae native to Western Australia.

It blooms between October and December producing blue-purple flowers.

It is found in wet depressions along the west coast in the South West, Wheatbelt and Mid West regions of Western Australia where it grows in sandy-clay soils.

References

pusilla
Flora of Western Australia
Plants described in 1837